Variations sur le nom de Marguerite Long (Variations on the name Marguerite Long) is a collaborative orchestral suite written by eight French composers in 1956, in honour of the pianist Marguerite Long.

It was first performed on 4 June 1956 by the Orchestre National de France under Charles Munch in a National Jubilee Concert organized by the French government in Long's honour, staged at the Grand Amphitheatre of the Sorbonne. "All of Paris" gathered at the venue where Long herself played Fauré's Ballade.

Three of the composers were members of Les Six: Georges Auric, Darius Milhaud and Francis Poulenc.  The other five were Jean-Yves Daniel-Lesur, Henri Dutilleux, Jean Françaix, Jean Rivier and Henri Sauguet.

In truth, only one of the movements was in the form of variations.  Sauguet's Variations en forme de Berceuse pour Marguerite Long was based on the letters EAGG, which come from her name, although not in the order in which they occur there.

Poulenc's Bucolique has become well known and has been recorded several times.  The remainder of the suite is little known.

Structure
The suite is structured as follows:
 Jean Françaix: Hymne solennel
 Henri  Sauguet: Variations en forme de Berceuse pour Marguerite Long
 Darius Milhaud: La Couronne de Marguerites ("The Crown of Daisies"), Valse en forme de rondo, Op. 353
 Jean Rivier: Nocturne
 Henri  Dutilleux: Sérénades
 Jean-Yves Daniel-Lesur: Intermezzo
 Francis Poulenc: Bucolique, FP 160
 Georges Auric: ML (Allegro: Finale)

Notes
 Rollo Myers, "Notes from Abroad", The Musical Times, July 1956, p. 380

References

Composer tributes (classical music)
Collaborations in classical music
1956 compositions
Compositions by Georges Auric
Compositions by Henri Dutilleux
Compositions by Jean Françaix
Compositions by Darius Milhaud
Compositions by Francis Poulenc
Compositions by Henri Sauguet
Compositions for symphony orchestra
Suites (music)
Variations
Les Six